Avery Malcolm Ellis  (born October 3, 1994) is a professional Canadian football defensive lineman for the Edmonton Elks of the Canadian Football League (CFL).

University career 
Ellis played college football for the Temple Owls from 2012 to 2016.

Professional career

Ottawa Redblacks 
Following his collegiate career, Ellis signed with the Ottawa Redblacks on May 8, 2017. He played in his first professional game on July 8, 2017, against the Toronto Argonauts, where he recorded two tackles, one sack, and one special teams tackle. He scored his first career touchdown on August 18, 2017, in a game against the Hamilton Tiger-Cats when he returned a fumble 30 yards for the score. In 2017, he played in 16 regular season games where he made 28 defensive tackles and six sacks.

Ellis played in the first six games of the 2018 season, before suffering an injury in the July 28 game against the Tiger-Cats. He returned for the last three games of the regular season and totalled 15 defensive tackles and three sacks in those nine games. Following an East Final victory against the Tiger-Cats, Ellis played in his first Grey Cup game where he recorded three tackles. However, the Redblacks lost the 106th Grey Cup championship to the Calgary Stampeders.

In 2019, Ellis played in all 18 regular season games and led the team with 54 defensive tackles and tied for the team lead with seven sacks. He did not play in 2020 due to the cancellation of the 2020 CFL season and he re-signed with the Redblacks on January 15, 2021. He became a free agent upon the expiry of his contract on February 8, 2022.

Montreal Alouettes
On February 8, 2022, it was announced that Ellis had signed with the Montreal Alouettes. He played in nine games where he had 17 defensive tackles and three sacks.

Edmonton Elks
On August 31, 2022, the Edmonton Elks acquired Ellis and a 2023 3rd Round Pick from the Montreal Alouettes in exchange for Thomas Costigan and Nafees Lyon.

Personal life 
Ellis was born in Newark, New Jersey, to parents Lisa Hunter and Byron Ellis, and raised in Montclair, New Jersey, where he attended Montclair High School. He has three younger sisters.

References

External links 
Edmonton Elks bio 

1994 births
Living people
American football defensive linemen
American players of Canadian football
Canadian football defensive linemen
Edmonton Elks players
Montclair High School (New Jersey) alumni
Montreal Alouettes players
Ottawa Redblacks players
People from Montclair, New Jersey
Players of American football from Newark, New Jersey
Players of Canadian football from Newark, New Jersey
Temple Owls football players